A bungee cord (sometimes spelled bungle; also known as a shock cord) is an elastic cord composed of one or more elastic strands forming a core, usually covered in a woven cotton or polypropylene sheath.  The sheath does not materially extend elastically, but it is braided with its strands spiralling around the core so that a longitudinal pull causes it to squeeze the core, transmitting the core's elastic compression to the longitudinal extension of the sheath and cord.  Specialized bungees, such as some used in bungee jumping, may be made entirely of elastic strands.

Uses 

Bungee cords have been used to provide a lightweight suspension for aircraft undercarriages from before World War I, and are still used on many small homebuilt aircraft where weight remains critical.  Bungee cords were also used in parachuting to assist in opening the old-style parachute container after the ripcord was pulled.

Today, bungee cords are most often used to secure objects without tying knots and to absorb shock.  Inexpensive bungee cords, with metal or plastic hooks on each end, are marketed as a general utility item.  In Australia, this form is known as an octopus, or "occy", strap, or as a jockey strap. These can be an individual strap, or a set of four hooked straps held together by a metal ring allowing the occy strap to secure items around various tie points, for example a suitcase to a car roof rack.  Extensions of the concept are available as a coarse net of bungee cords with metal or plastic hooks around the periphery, for securing irregularly shaped loads of luggage and cargo on the backs of pickup trucks, roofs of cars, and so on. 

Bungee cords have also been used to make bungee chairs and for other purposes.

Etymology 

The origin of the name "bungee", "bungie" or "bungy" is uncertain. The Oxford English Dictionary records the use of the phrase in 1938 for launching of gliders using an elasticated cord.

Hazards 

Bungee cords are a major source of eye injury, and some doctors suggest not using them.

References 

Fasteners